Cambridge Centre is a shopping mall in Cambridge, Ontario, Canada. In the 1980s, Hespeler Road became the city's major commercial area, and is now known as the Highway 24/Hespeler Road Commercial District. The main anchor store is a Hudson's Bay. Construction recently transformed the previous anchor store Target into part of the mall adding SportChek on the front side and Kingpin on the backside.

History
Cambridge Centre opened in 1996, on a site previously occupied by the John Galt Centre which was constructed in 1973.  A Right House department store had been located in the John Galt Centre. The original anchors of the mall were Miracle Mart (at the current Marks, Marshalls, King Pin & Sport Chek sites) and Miracle Food Mart (at the current Forever 21 store site). The 1996 conversion and expansion doubled the length of the main shopping corridor with a fountain and new food court joining the old with the new. The construction of a 2-storey The Bay Department Store as the north anchor, the area which previously housed Miracle Mart and The Right House was expanded and reconstructed for Zellers which became the south anchor, and the previous Sears Outlet Store was converted into a 10-screen Cambridge Centre Cinemas.

The mall underwent further expansion in 2002, which saw the construction of the 2 story Sears Department Store with many new stores, the relocation of the food court to the new wing and a National Hockey League-sized ice rink known as the Cambridge Ice Centre. The new wing shaped like a horseshoe connects to the main corridor and now the mall has reached its current size. Since 1996, $100 million has been invested in the enhancement of Cambridge Centre.

Community involvement
Cambridge Centre supports charities in the Waterloo Region, with a Community Kiosk that is available free of charge to registered local charities.

Transit terminal

Cambridge Centre is one of the principal interchange points for Grand River Transit buses in Cambridge. The terminal was moved to a new structure outside the front entrance of the mall, facing Hespeler Road, in December 2016. GRT's South Garage is also located nearby, on Conestoga Boulevard. The terminal had previously been located on the south side of the mall, on Dunbar Road.

References

Buildings and structures in Cambridge, Ontario
Shopping malls in the Regional Municipality of Waterloo
Shopping malls established in 1973